Valeria Vereau (born 1986) is a Peruvian-born Spanish actress and producer.

Biography 
Vereau was born in Lima, Perú on 9 December 1986. She is the youngest of three siblings.  Her mother who is Peruvian, is of English and Spanish-French descent, and her father, is of French and Spanish descent. When Valeria was two years of age her family moved to Toronto, Ontario, Canada. Nine years later, the entire family moved to Madrid, Spain.

After her parents separation in 1999, Valeria and her brother lived with their mother. She began to work at an early age to help her mother pay for costs. At 18 once high school finished, Valeria sign up to one of Spain's most prestigious drama school's Cristina Rota where she trained for three years.

The following years she began modelling and appearing in several commercial campaigns and beauty shoots until her debut on screen with a small role for Pedro Almodovar's film Volver (2006). In 2007 she would collaborate with Julio Medém in Caótica Ana. She has also appeared in several Spanish TV series such as Los Simuladores, Ángel o Demonio, El Fútbol nos vuelve Locos, Homicidios, El Don De Alba among others. She moved to London, England in 2012.

There she landed her first role for the TV series Dark Matters: Twisted But True. She was also cast for several short films and commercials until she scored her first feature film in the Trilogy of David Hare Salting the Battlefield co-starring, Bill Nighy and Judy Davis. Valeria played Emma in the thriller Extinction (2015), alongside Matthew Fox, Jeffrey Donovan and Clara Lago, in an adaptation of Juan de Dios Garduño's bestseller book Y pese a todo. In 2015 she also appeared in the new BBC One drama series The Interceptor, where she plays Sonia the Spanish Interpreter.

Filmography

Film

Television

References

External links 
 
 Valeria Vereau in Twitter
 Valeria Vereau in Instagram

1986 births
Spanish film actresses
Living people
20th-century Spanish actresses
21st-century Spanish actresses
Actresses from Lima
Actresses from Toronto
Peruvian expatriates in Spain
Peruvian expatriates in Canada